Zoe Mackenzie Chabot Burns (born January 5, 2002) is a soccer player who plays as a defender for the USC Trojans. Born in the United States, she represents the Canada national team.

Early life
Born in the United States to parents of Canadian descent, she began playing soccer at age five with Eastside FC. She later played with the Crossfire Premier, where she earned United Soccer Coaches All-American status in 2019. She played at the state level with the Washington State ODP/EDP from 2015 to 2017, winning one U.S. Youth Soccer ODP Championship in 2016, and 4 region titles in 2016 and 2017.

College career
Burns began attending the University of Southern California in 2020, playing for the USC Trojans women's soccer team. She scored her first goal on April 30, 2021 in a playoff game against the Ole Miss Rebels. In her sophomore season, she earned All-Pac-12 Second Team honours. After her junior season, she was named to the United Soccer Coaches All-Region Second Team and the All-Pac 12 Second Team.

International career
From 2016 to 2018, she was part of the United States Youth National Team programs, attending multiple U16 camps. In 2018, she was part of the United States U16 team helping the U.S. to a UEFA Development Tournament Championship in Portugal in 2018, recording an assist in the final game to clinch the title.

In February 2022, she was named to the Canada U20 for the 2022 CONCACAF Women's U-20 Championship. She scored her first goal on March 4 in a 13-0 victory over the Cayman Islands. In the third place game on March 12, she scored Canada's first goal via a penalty kick in a 2-0 win over Puerto Rico, which qualified Canada for the 2022 FIFA U-20 Women's World Cup. She was named to the tournament's Best XI.

In March 2022, she was called up to the Canada senior team ahead of a pair of friendlies against Nigeria. She made her debut on April 11 against Nigeria, coming on as a second-half substitute.

References

External links

Living people
2002 births
Citizens of Canada through descent
Canadian women's soccer players
Women's association football defenders
Canada women's international soccer players
USC Trojans women's soccer players
American women's soccer players
American people of Canadian descent
Soccer players from Washington (state)
People from Issaquah, Washington